San Benigno Canavese (Piedmontese: San Balègn) is a comune (municipality) in the Metropolitan City of Turin in the Italian region Piedmont, located about 20 km northeast of Turin, whose territory is bordered by the Malone and Orco rivers.

Main sights
Fruttuaria Abbey (founded in 1003). Of the original Romanesque edifice, only the bell tower remains today.
Griffons Mosaic, considered amongst the most notable example of mosaic art in Piedmont.

Ricetto ("Fortified store", 15th century), of which one of the three gates and a corner tower are visible today.
 San Benigno Canavese railway station

References

External links
 Official website

Canavese